Sunand Tryambak Joshi (born June 22, 1958) is an American literary critic whose work has largely focused on weird and fantastic fiction, especially the life and work of H. P. Lovecraft and associated writers.

Career
His literary criticism focuses upon the worldviews of authors. His The Weird Tale examines horror and fantasy writing by Arthur Machen, Algernon Blackwood, Lord Dunsany, M. R. James, Ambrose Bierce, and Lovecraft.

Personal life
S. T. Joshi was born on June 22, 1958 in Pune, India to Tryambak M. Joshi and Padmini T. Joshi. When he was four, his family moved to the United States and settled in Indiana. He discovered the work of Lovecraft at age 13 in a public library in Muncie, Indiana. He also read L. Sprague de Camp's biography of Lovecraft, Lovecraft: A Biography, on publication in 1975, and began thereafter to devote himself to Lovecraft. This devotion led him to decline offers from Yale and Harvard so that he could attend Brown University. He is an atheist.

Currently, he lives in Seattle, Washington. Joshi married Leslie Gary Boba on September 1, 2001. They divorced in December 2010.

In August 2014, Joshi opposed the campaign to change the World Fantasy Award statuette from Gahan Wilson's bust of Lovecraft to one of African-American author Octavia Butler, and returned his World Fantasy Awards in protest.

Notable publications

Books
Lord Dunsany: A Bibliography (1993) (co-writer: Darrell Schweitzer) 
H. P. Lovecraft: A Life (1996)
Sixty Years of Arkham  House: A History and Bibliography (Arkham House, 1999) 
I Am Providence: The Life and Times of H. P. Lovecraft (2010)
Lord Dunsany: A Comprehensive Bibliography (2013)

Edited volumes
Miscellaneous Writings by H. P. Lovecraft (Arkham House, 1995).
The Call of Cthulhu and Other Weird Stories by H. P. Lovecraft (Penguin Classics No. 1, 1999).
The Thing on the Doorstep and Other Weird Stories by H. P. Lovecraft (Penguin Classics No. 2, 2001).
The Dreams in the Witch House and Other Weird Stories by H. P. Lovecraft (Penguin Classics No. 3, 2005).

Awards

References

External links

1958 births
Living people
American literary critics
American male biographers
American book editors
American speculative fiction critics
American speculative fiction editors
American atheists
Brown University alumni
American male writers of Indian descent
H. P. Lovecraft scholars
Indian emigrants to the United States
Science fiction critics
Science fiction editors
World Fantasy Award-winning writers
Writers from Pune
Cthulhu Mythos writers
American satirists
Weird fiction writers
Weird fiction publishers
American editors
Critics of religions
20th-century American male writers
21st-century American male writers
20th-century American non-fiction writers
21st-century American non-fiction writers
Writers from Seattle
People from Muncie, Indiana